Spencer is a given name of British origin, that means "steward" or "administrator". It is a shortened form of the English word dispenser, which derives from Anglo-French dispensour, from Old French dispenseor, from Latin dispensatorem, the agent noun of dispensare, meaning "to disperse, administer, and distribute (by weight)". The name originated as the surname Spencer, but later gradually came to be used as a given name as well.

From its origin as a surname, it has been given to both males and females, but it has historically been more common as a name for males. According to the Social Security Administration of the United States, its popularity as a male given name began increasing steadily in the early twentieth century and spiked dramatically in the 1980s, 1990s, and early 2000s. Its usage peaked in 1998 with 4,619 baby boys named Spencer in that year. In the late 2000s, the name's popularity for male infants declined and plateaued between roughly 1,400 - 1,500 boys named Spencer each year.

Its usage as a female given name began to gradually increase in the late 1970s before suddenly taking off in the mid-1980s. Female usage of the name declined in the late 2000s, but has been rising rapidly since 2009. 244 baby girls were named Spencer in 2016.

List of persons with the given name

A
Spencer Abbott (disambiguation), multiple people, including:
Spencer Abbott (baseball) (1877–1951), American baseball player
Spencer Abbott (ice hockey) (born 1988), Canadian ice hockey player
Spencer Abraham (born 1952), American politician
Spencer Ackerman, American journalist
Spencer Adams (1898–1970), American baseball player
Spencer Adkins (born 1987), American football player
Spencer Albee (born 1976), American musician
Spencer Allen (1893–1978), English cricketer
Spencer Antle (born 1969), American fashion designer
Spencer Armstrong (born 1986), Canadian football player
Spencer Asah (died 1954), American painter
Spencer Austen-Leigh (1834-1913), English cricketer

B
Spencer Bachus (born 1947), American politician
Spencer Banks (born 1954), British television actor
Spencer Batiste (born 1945), British politician
Spencer Fullerton Baird (1823–1887), American ornithologist
Spencer Barrett (ecologist) (born 1948), Canadian ecologist
Spencer Bayles, British musician and former Guinness World Record holder
Spencer Bedford (1851-1933), English-born Canadian politician
Spencer Bell (actor) (1887-1935), American actor
Spencer Gordon Bennet (1893–1987), American director
Spencer John Bent (1891–1977), British army officer
Spencer Bernard, American musician and songwriter
Spencer Bernard (politician) (1918-2001), American politician
Spencer Black (born 1950), American politician
Spencer Bloch (born 1944), American mathematician
Spencer Bohren (born 1950), American musician
Spencer Boldman (born 1992), American actor
Spencer Breslin (born 1992), American actor and musician
Spencer Brown (disambiguation), multiple people
Spencer Burford (born 2000), American football player
Spencer Butterfield (born 1992), American basketball player

C
Spencer Cavendish, 8th Duke of Devonshire (1833–1908), British politician
Spencer Chamberlain (born 1983), American singer for the Christian post-hardcore band Underoath
Spencer Chan (1892–1988), American character actor
Spencer Charrington (1818–1904), British politician
Spencer Charters (1875–1943), American actor
Spencer Christian (born 1947), American television personality
Spencer Clark (disambiguation), multiple people, including:
Spencer M. Clark (1811–1890), American National Currency Bureau Superintendent
Spencer Treat Clark (born 1987), American actor
Spencer Clark (musician) (1908–1998), American jazz musician
Spencer Clark (racer) (1987–2006), American race car driver
Spencer Coggs (born 1949), American politician
Spencer Compton (disambiguation), multiple people, including:
Spencer Compton, 1st Earl of Wilmington (1673–1743), British politician
Spencer Compton, 2nd Earl of Northampton (1601–1643), British politician
Spencer Compton, 8th Earl of Northampton (1738–1796), British politician
Spencer Compton, 2nd Marquess of Northampton (1790–1851), British nobleman
Spencer Compton, 7th Marquess of Northampton (born 1946), British nobleman
Spencer J. Condie (born 1940), American leader of The Church of Jesus Christ of Latter-day Saints
Spencer Houghton Cone (1785–1855), American child prodigy and Baptist chaplain
Spencer Cowper (1670–1728), British politician
Spencer Cozens (born 1965), English musician
Spencer Crakanthorp (1885–1936), Australian chess player

D
Spencer Daniels (born 1992), American actor
Spencer Davey (born 1983), British rugby player
Spencer Davis (1939–2020), British musician
Spencer de Grey (born 1944), British architect
Spencer Dickinson (politician), American politician
Spencer Dinwiddie, American basketball player
Spencer Dryden (1938–2005), American musician

E
Spencer Eccles (born 1934), American philanthropist
Spencer Elden (born 1991), American model and artist
Spencer Evans (born 1973), Welsh soccer player

F
Spencer Fearon (born 1962), British media personality
Spencer Finch, American artist
Spencer Fisher (born 1976), American mixed martial arts fighter
Spencer O. Fisher (1843–1919), American politician
Spencer Folau (born 1973), Tongan-born American football player
Spencer Ford (born 1976), American lacrosse player
Spencer Ford (American football), American college football coach
Spencer Fox (born 1993), American actor

G
Spencer Garrett (born 1963), American actor
Spencer Gollan (1860–1934), New Zealand athlete
Spencer Gore (disambiguation), multiple people, including:
Spencer Gore (sportsman) (1850–1906), British athlete
Spencer Gore (artist) (1878–1914), British painter
Spencer Grammer (born 1983), American actress

H
Spencer Hall (1805–1875), British librarian
Spencer Havner (born 1983), American football player
Spencer Hawes (born 1988), American basketball player
Spencer Hays (born c. 1936), American businessman and art collector
Spencer Haywood (born 1949), American basketball player
Spencer Heath (1876–1963), American anarchist, engineer, attorney, inventor, manufacturer, poet, philosopher and social thinker
Spencer Heath (baseball) (1893–1930), American baseball player
Spencer Chandra Herbert (born 1981), Canadian politician
Spencer Edmund Hollond (1874–1950), British World War I army officer
Spencer Holst (1926–2001), American writer
Spencer B. Horn (1895–1969), British soldier and World War I flying ace
Spencer Horsey de Horsey (1790–1860), British politician
Spencer Howard (born 1996), American professional baseball player
Spencer Howson (born 1972), British-born Australian radio personality
Spencer Hu (born 1993), Chinese data scientist and old fashion Enthusiast

J
Spencer James (born 1953), British musician
Spencer Jarnagin (1792–1853), American politician
Spencer Johnson (disambiguation), multiple people, including:
Spencer Johnson (American football) (born 1981), American football player
Spencer Johnson (writer) (born 1940), American author
Spencer Jones (disambiguation), multiple people, including:
Spencer Cone Jones (1836–1915), American politician
Spencer P. Jones (born 1956), New Zealand musician

K
Spencer Kayden (born 1971), American actress
Spencer Kelly (born 1973), British television personality
Spencer W. Kimball (1895–1985), American president of The Church of Jesus Christ of Latter-day Saints
Spencer Matthews King (born 1917), Puerto Rican-born American Ambassador
Spencer Kobren, American businessman, author and radio personality
Spencer Krug (born 1977), Canadian singer, songwriter and keyboardist

L
Spencer Lanning (born 1988), American gridiron football punter
Spencer Larsen (born 1984), American football fullback 
Spencer List (born April 6, 1998), American actor
Spencer Lister (1876–1939), English-born South African doctor and bacteriologist
Spencer Locke (born 1991), American actress
Spencer G. Lucas, American paleontologist

M
Spencer G. Millard (1856–1895), American politician
Spencer Le Marchant Moore (1850–1931), British botanist

N
Spencer Nelson (born 1980), American Gaelic games champion

O
Spencer Odom (1913-1962), pianist-arranger
R. Spencer Oliver (born 1938), American government staffer and diplomat
Spencer Oliver (born 1975), English former professional boxer
Spencer Overton (born 1968), American lawyer
Spencer O'Brien (born 1988), Canadian snowboarder

P
Spencer J. Palmer (1927–2000), American historian and chronicler of The Church of Jesus Christ of Latter-day Saints
Spencer Patton (born 1988), American professional baseball player
Spencer Penrose (1865–1939), American philanthropist
Spencer Perceval (disambiguation), multiple people, including:
Spencer Perceval (1762–1812), British Prime Minister
Spencer Perceval (junior) (1795–1859), British politician
Spencer George Perceval (1838–1922), English geologist and antiquary
Spencer Petras (born 1999), American football player
Spencer Darwin Pettis (1802–1831), American politician
Spencer Ponsonby-Fane (1824–1915), British cricketer and civil servant
Spencer Pope (1893–1976), American football player
Spence Powell (1903–1970), Australian politician
Spencer Pratt (born 1983), American actor
Spencer Prior (born 1971), English soccer player
Spencer Pumpelly (born 1974), American race car driver

R
Spencer Rattler (born 2000), Oklahoma Sooners quarterback
Spencer Redford (born 1983), American former actress and singer
Spencer Reid (born 1981), a character in the CBS show Criminal Minds
Spencer Rice (born 1967), Canadian writer, director, producer, and comedian
Spencer Ross (born 1940), American sportscaster

S
Spencer Sanders (born 1999), American football player
Spencer Schnell (born 1994), American football player
Spencer Scott (born 1989), American model, pornographic actress, and Playboy Playmate
Spencer Gene Settles (born 1953), American football player
Spencer Sotelo (born 1987), American singer
Spencer Smith (disambiguation), multiple people, including:
Spencer Stone (born 1992), American U.S. Air Force staff sergeant

T
Spencer Tracy (1900–1967), American actor
Spencer Tunick (born 1967), American photographer

V
Spencer Verbiest (born 1984), Belgian soccer player

W
Spencer Horatio Walpole (1806–1898), British politician
Spencer Weir-Daley (born 1985), British soccer player
Spencer Weisz, American-Israeli basketball player
Spencer Wells (born 1969), American geneticist and anthropologist
Spencer West (born 1981), American motivational speaker and disability advocate
Spencer Williams (disambiguation), multiple people, including:
Spencer Williams (1889–1965), American jazz musician
Spencer Mortimer Williams (1922–2008), American federal judge
Spencer Williams (actor) (1893–1969), American actor

Fictional characters
Spencer, a character from the British television series Thomas & Friends
Spencer Carlin, a character from the American teen drama television series South of Nowhere
Spencer Gray, a character from the British soap opera Hollyoaks
Spencer Hastings, a character from the American teen drama Pretty Little Liars
Spencer Reid, a character from the American police-procedural television program Criminal Minds
 Spencer Ricks, a character from the American TV program Charmed
Spencer Rosegunde Thomas, a character from the American radio and television Western drama series Gunsmoke
Spencer Shay, a character from the American teen sitcom iCarly
Spencer Walsh, a character from the American sitcom Good Luck Charlie

Spencer the Painter, a character from the British children's television programme, Balamory

References

English-language masculine given names
English masculine given names
English unisex given names
English-language unisex given names